This is a list of lists of libraries by country.

Libraries by country 

 
 Libraries in Afghanistan
 Libraries in Albania
 Libraries in Australia
 Libraries in Austria
 Libraries in Bangladesh
 Libraries in Belgium
 Libraries in Belize
 Libraries in Brunei
 Libraries in Cuba
 Libraries in the Federated States of Micronesia
 Libraries in Germany
 Libraries in Ghana
 Libraries in Hong Kong
 Libraries in India
 Libraries in Italy
 Libraries in Japan
 Libraries in Kenya
 Libraries in Lebanon
 Libraries in Malta
 Libraries in the Netherlands
 Libraries in New Zealand
 Libraries in Nigeria
 Libraries in Pakistan
 Libraries in Singapore
 Libraries in Scotland
 Libraries in Spain
 Libraries in Sri Lanka
 Libraries in Thailand
 Largest libraries in the United States

See also 
 List of libraries
 List of national and state libraries
 List of archives

 
Cultural heritage by country